Bombus flavidus is a species of cuckoo bumblebee found in Austria, Finland, France, Germany, Italy, Poland, Slovenia, Spain, and Switzerland.

References

Bumblebees
Insects described in 1852
Hymenoptera of Europe